María José Martínez and Anabel Medina Garrigues won in the final 6–1, 6–7 (5–7), 7–5 against Alexandra Fusai and Rita Grande.

Seeds
Champion seeds are indicated in bold text while text in italics indicates the round in which those seeds were eliminated.

 Arantxa Sánchez Vicario /  Magüi Serna (quarterfinals)
 Alexandra Fusai /  Rita Grande (final)
 Tina Križan /  Katarina Srebotnik (semifinals)
 Karina Habšudová /  Iroda Tulyaganova (first round)

Draw

References
 2001 Porto Open Doubles Draw

2001 Doubles
2001 WTA Tour
2001 in Portuguese tennis